Mazaeras macasia is a moth of the family Erebidae. It was described by William Schaus in 1924. It is found in Brazil and Ecuador.

Subspecies
Mazaeras macasia macasia (Ecuador)
Mazaeras macasia castrensis (Rothschild, 1917) (Brazil)

References

Phaegopterina
Moths described in 1924